Under the Merovingian dynasty, the mayor of the palace ( or ) was the manager of the household of the Frankish king. 

During the second half of the seventh century, the office evolved into the "power behind the throne". At that time the mayor of the palace held and wielded the real and effective power to make decisions affecting the kingdom, while the kings were increasingly reduced to performing merely ceremonial functions, which made them little more than figureheads ('do-nothing kings'). The office may be compared to that of the peshwa,  or prime minister, all of which have similarly been the real powers behind some ceremonial monarchs.

In 687, after victory over the western kingdom of Neustria, the Austrasian mayor, Pippin of Herstal, took the title Duke of the Franks to signify his augmented rule. His son and successor, Charles Martel, ruled without elevating a new king during the last four years of his reign (737–741). His sons Carloman and Pepin the Younger elevated another Merovingian king, Childeric III, but he was eventually deposed in 751 by Pepin, who was crowned king in his place. 

See also Royal Administration of Merovingian and Carolingian Dynasties.

Mayors of the Palace of Austrasia
Parthemius (until 548)
Gogo (c. 567–581), during the minority of Childebert II
Wandalenus (from 581), during the minority of Childebert II
Gundulf (from 600), under Theudebert II
Warnachar (612–617), also in Burgundy
Hugh (Chucus) (617–623)
Pepin of Landen (623–629), under Dagobert I
Adalgisel (633–639)
Pepin of Landen (639–640), again
Otto (640–642 or 643)
Grimoald I (642 or 643–656)
Wulfoald (656–680), 673–675 also in Neustria
Pepin of Herstal (680–714), took the title Duke and Prince of the Franks (dux et princeps Francorum) after his conquest of Neustria in 687
Theudoald (714–715), also in Neustria. Designated heir of his grandfather Pepin, opposed by the nobility who acclaimed Charles Martel.
Charles Martel (715–741), also in Neustria (718–741)
Carloman (741–747)
Pepin the Younger (747–751), became king of the Franks in 751

Mayors of the Palace of Neustria
Mummolin (566)
Landric, under Clotaire II
Gundoland (613 or 616–639)
Aega (639–641), also in Burgundy
Erchinoald (641–658)
Ebroin (658–673), deposed
Wulfoald (673–675), also in Austrasia (662–680)
Leudesius (675), chosen but later deposed
Ebroin (675–680), again
Waratton (680 or 681–682), deposed by his son Gistemar
Gistemar (682), usurper his father Waratton
Waratton (682–684 or 686), again
Berchar (686–688 or 689), murdered in 688 or 689
Pippin of Herstal (688–695), represented in court by his follower Nordebert
Grimoald II (695–714)
Theudoald (714–715), also in Austrasia. Driven out of Neustria by the nobility, surrendered claim in 716.
Ragenfrid (715–718), took power in Neustria in 714 or 715 but defeated by Charles Martel first in 717 and definitively in 718
Charles Martel (718–741), also in Austrasia (715–741)
Pepin the Younger (741 or 742–751), became king of the Franks in 751

Mayors of the Palace of Burgundy

Warnachar I (596–599)
Berthoald (before 603–604)
Protadius (604–606)
Claudius
Rado (613–617)
Warnachar II (617–626), also in Austrasia
Godinus (626–627)
...
Aega (639–641), also in Neustria
Flaochad (642)
Radobertus (642–662)

Hereafter the office remained vacant, with Burgundy a separate realm under the King of Neustria and Burgundy. The administration of Burgundy was briefly separate under:

Drogo (695–708), also duke of Champagne from 690 and duke of Burgundy from 697

Mayors of the Palace of Aquitaine

Brodulf (627–628)

Further reading
Oman, Charles. The Dark Ages, 476–918. London: Rivingtons, 1914.

 
Pippinids
Titles

no:Liste over frankiske rikshovmestre